Let It Be Love, also known as 4 In Love, is a Hong Kong modern romance drama produced by TVB and starring Moses Chan, Charmaine Sheh and Kenny Wong. An internal costume fitting was held on 27 May 2011 and the official costume fitting was held on 3 June 2011 at Tseung Kwan O TVB City Studio One at 12:30 pm. The premiere episode aired on 31 January 2012.

Plot summary
Tung Hoi Yiu, Chloe (Charmaine Sheh), is an international superstar, and as a publicity stunt she visits longtime fan Yu Chun Tung (Moses Chan), in hospital and their lives become entangled. The tabloid press and blogosphere feed on each other to create the impression that the two are in fact dating. In order to control the news coverage, Chloe's management company creates the illusion of a lightning romance and an equally quick break up between Chloe and Chun Tung, with Chloe being portrayed as the wronged party. Since she was 16 and discovered by a talent spotter, Chloe's life and career has been under the control of her cousin Tung Mei Mei, May (Florence Kwok). To escape the manipulations of her cousin, Chloe announces her retirement from the entertainment industry. However, in the short period of their supposed romance Chloe has come to care for Chun Tung, and May uses this to force Chloe to return to the entertainment industry.

Whilst abroad Chloe discovers the extent of May's manipulations - that May has been feigning terminal cancer and that her previous boyfriend broke up with her because May used her phone to send a Dear John message. In a fit of pique and to the surprise of everyone, including Chun Tung, Chloe holds a spot news conference in which she announces her imminent marriage to Chun Tung. Despite only superficially knowing Chloe, Chun Tung can't believe his luck and agrees to the marriage proposal. May and her coterie of followers are forced to play along with Chloe, but work to drive the couple apart. Despite finding some happiness together, Chun Tung and Chloe have little in the way of understanding and trust between each other and, with only minimal help from May, the couple part.

However, May realises that Chloe has truly fallen in love with Chun Tung. May sees in Chloe's latest film performance a rejection of things that Chloe had previously held dear and that the only reason for this is that her breaking with Chun Tung has broken her spirit. Filled with guilt May attempts to help Chun Tung understand Chloe in the hope that in doing so he can come to love the real Chloe and not the illusion presented to the world.

As they negotiate the travails of life and love, Chloe and Chun Tung's lives cross and touch with other couples making their own choices. Chung Ping Leung (Wai Ka Hung) and Elsa (Tracy Ip) are kindred souls, well matched by personality but not by physique. Nick (King Kong Lee) and Hayley (Rachel Kan) have both been scarred by bad relationships and are unable to form meaningful bonds with the opposite sex. However, when Nick becomes impotent they find that they have more in common than just a long history of one-night stands. Poon Chun Him's (Kenny Wong) relationships are perpetually out of sync. Whenever he is ready for marriage his girlfriends are not and vice versa. When his friends Yeung Chi Wah (Patrick Dunn) and Fung Yiu Dan, Kelly (Elvina Kong) divorce after it is discovered that Yeung has been harbouring a secret homosexual infatuation for him, Poon and Kelly find themselves being drawn to each other, but this time will their timing be in sync?

Cast

Main cast

Tung Family

Law Family

Chow Family

Chung Family

Other cast

Viewership ratings

References

Hong Kong television shows
TVB dramas
2012 Hong Kong television series debuts
2012 Hong Kong television series endings